Paris 1967/San Francisco 1968 is a posthumous live album by the Jimi Hendrix Experience, released on April 24, 2003, by Dagger Records. The album contains songs from the group's performances at the L' Olympia Theatre in Paris on October 9, 1967, and the Fillmore Auditorium in San Francisco, California, on February 4, 1968. In 2021, an expanded edition focusing on the Paris performance was released by Dagger.

Track listing

2021 Expanded edition
For Record Store Day November 26, 2021, Dagger released an expanded edition titled Paris 1967. In addition to the tracks recorded in Paris from the original, it includes an additional two songs that were released on the 2000 box set The Jimi Hendrix Experience: "Catfish Blues" (based on Muddy Waters' "Rollin' Stone"/"Still a Fool") and the blues standard "Rock Me Baby".

In a review for AllMusic, Fred Thomas gave the album four out of five stars. He commented on several of the album's songs and concluded, "The rudimentary two-track stereo recording is raw, but it matches the band's energy in what amounts to a definitive example of how the Experience were operating on-stage as they skyrocketed to fame." The expanded edition reached number 117 on the Billboard 200 album chart.

Personnel
 Jimi Hendrixguitar, vocals
 Mitch Mitchelldrums
 Noel Reddingbass guitar
 Buddy Milesdrums on "Dear Mr. Fantasy Part 1 & 2"

References

Live albums published posthumously
Jimi Hendrix live albums
2003 live albums
Dagger Records live albums
Albums recorded at the Olympia (Paris)
Albums recorded at the Fillmore